Bostryx ceroplasta is a species of  tropical air-breathing land snail, a pulmonate gastropod mollusk in the family Bulimulidae.

Distribution 

 Peru

Description 
The shells are, as Pilsbry calls them, ‘waxen white’. Some specimens have the apex coloured, corneous or with a yellow hue.

References
This article incorporates CC-BY-3.0 text from the reference 

Bulimulidae
Gastropods described in 1896